The Völkisch-Social Bloc ("Völkisch-Sozialer Block" or "Völkisch-Sozialer-Block" or "VSB" or "V-S-B") was a right-wing electoral alliance in post World War I Germany. Its philosophy was loosely aligned with that of the NSDAP (Nazi Party).

Anton Drexler was elected in February 1924 to the Bavarian Landtag as a representative of the VSB. Artur Dinter was elected in February 1924 to the Thuringian Landtag as a representative of the VSB. He was expelled from the party in December 1924. Rudolf Jordan was active as a speaker for the VSB by 1924, though he was not a member.

Notes

Defunct political parties in Germany
Far-right political parties in Germany
Political parties in the Weimar Republic
German nationalist political parties